A Simon Rockower Award is an award presented by the American Jewish Press Association for "Excellence in Jewish Journalism", at a banquet in November each year.

They were created in 1979 by the children of Simon Rockower.

List of categories 
As of the 2016 awards there were 24 categories, and as of 2017, 22.

References

Jewish media
Jewish printing and publishing
Jewish-American press
American journalism awards